Osphrantis is a genus of moths of the family Crambidae. It contains only one species, Osphrantis paraphaea, which is found on the Talaud Islands, Indonesia.

References

Natural History Museum Lepidoptera genus database

Acentropinae
Taxa named by Edward Meyrick
Monotypic moth genera
Moths of Indonesia
Crambidae genera